Rørvik or Rørvika (or the anglicized Rorvik) may refer to:

People
 David Rorvik, an American writer

Places
 Rørvik, the municipal center of the municipality of Vikna in Trøndelag county, Norway
 Rørvik Airport, Ryum, the airport near the village of Rørvik in the municipality of Vikna in Trøndelag county, Norway
 Rørvik, Møre og Romsdal, a village on the island of Vigra in Giske municipality in Møre og Romsdal county, Norway
 Rørvika, a village in the municipality of Tysfjord in Nordland county, Norway
 Rørvika, Trøndelag, a village and ferry quay in Indre Fosen municipality in Trøndelag county, Norway

See also
 Røyrvik, a similarly-spelled municipality in Trøndelag county, Norway